Zael may refer to:
Zael, Province of Burgos, a municipality and town located in Castile and León, Spain.
Sahl ibn Bishr, a Jewish astrologer, astronomer and mathematician from Tabaristan.